Phanerota is a genus of rove beetles in the family Staphylinidae. There are about five described species in Phanerota.

Species
These five species belong to the genus Phanerota:
 Phanerota brunnessa Ashe, 1986
 Phanerota carinata Seevers, 1951
 Phanerota cubensis Casey, 1906
 Phanerota dissimilis (Erichson, 1839)
 Phanerota fasciata (Say, 1834)

References

Further reading

 
 
 
 

Aleocharinae
Articles created by Qbugbot